Arytropteris is a genus of shield-backed katydids, containing the following species:

 Arytropteris basalis (Walker, 1869) – flat-necked shieldback
 Arytropteris granulithorax Péringuey, 1916 – east coast flat-necked shieldback
 Arytropteris pondo (Rentz, 1988) – Pondo flat-necked shieldback

See also
 Thoracistus

References 

Tettigoniinae
Tettigoniidae genera